Chris or Christopher Egan may refer to:

Chris Egan (footballer) (born 1986), Australian rules footballer
Chris Egan (musician), British composer, orchestrator, conductor and musical director
Chris Egan (tennis), tennis player of the 1990s
Christopher Egan (born 1984), Australian actor
Christopher F. Egan, American businessman and diplomat